"Ginny, Ginny" is a song by the British rock band Slade, released in 1979 as the lead single from the band's eighth studio album Return to Base. It was written by lead vocalist Noddy Holder and bassist Jim Lea, and was produced by Slade. The song failed to make an appearance in the UK charts.

Background
Having returned to the United Kingdom from the United States in 1976, Slade found themselves out-of-favour at the time of the UK's Punk rock explosion. Slade's waning success soon led to the band playing small gigs, including universities and clubs, but despite being successful at filling small venues, their new records were barely selling. Slade released "Ginny, Ginny" in May 1979 as the lead single from their upcoming album Return to Base. However, it was another commercial flop, failing to enter the UK Top 75. Despite this, the song did enter the Top 200 Best Sellers Chart, which was confirmed by Barn Records managing director Mike Hales in a Slade fan club magazine at the time.

"Ginny, Ginny" originally had the titles "Jeanie" and "Ginny Come and Get It While You Can" before the band settled on its final title. Prior to release, Lea spoke of the song and the band's hopes of returning to the charts: "It's very catchy, and we're going to make it, yeah. Our writing is returning to a more concise format." In a 1979 fan club interview after the single's release, drummer Don Powell spoke of the song: "It didn't sell enough to get into the charts, but we were pleased with it."

Release
"Ginny, Ginny" was released on 7" vinyl by Barn Records in the UK and New Zealand. The B-side, "Dizzy Mama", would later appear as a track on the band's 1981 album We'll Bring the House Down. In the UK, the single was released on yellow-coloured vinyl in the hope of gaining more sales. In New Zealand, a standard black-coloured vinyl was released. "Ginny, Ginny" would also later appear as the B-side to the band's 1980 Belgian-only single "I'm a Rocker".

Critical reception
Upon release, Record Mirror didn't feel the song would become a big hit, though it "might be a foothold on the bottom of the charts". New Musical Express felt the song was "a lot better than previous comeback attempts, but still not quite strong enough to compete with other chart contenders".

Formats
7" Single
"Ginny Ginny" - 3:50
"Dizzy Mama" - 3:57

Cover versions
During 1979-80, Jim Lea would record his own version of the song, "Jeanie, Jeanie", with his brother Frank as part of his side-project The Dummies. This version of the song would not surface until 1992, when it was included on A Day in the Life of the Dummies, an album that gathered The Dummies' recordings.

Personnel
Noddy Holder - lead vocals, guitar, producer
Dave Hill - lead guitar, backing vocals, producer
Jim Lea - bass, backing vocals, producer
Don Powell - drums, producer

References

1979 songs
1979 singles
Slade songs
Songs written by Noddy Holder
Songs written by Jim Lea
Song recordings produced by Jim Lea
Song recordings produced by Noddy Holder
Song recordings produced by Dave Hill
Song recordings produced by Don Powell